Rhododendron fastigiatum is a dwarf lepidote rhododendron species with purple flowers native to Yunnan, China. Cultivars include 'Best Dark Purple’.

References

Bibliography 

 The Plant List: Rhododendron fastigiatum
 Hirsutum: Rhododendron fastigiatum

fastigiatum